San Francesco is a Roman Catholic church and convent located inside the municipality of Valfornace, province of Macerata, region of Marche, Italy.

History
The church was erected in 14th century, but along with the adjacent convent, underwent many reconstructions. Beyond the apse rises a belltower. The church has corner buttresses and has a trussed wooden roof, and has a 19th-century copy of the venerated Crucifix of San Damiano di Assisi. Tradition holds that this church once held the original, but that it was destroyed by a fire in 1892. The church has a single nave with lateral altars. Restorations in the 20th century uncovered frescoes in the apse and nave walls attributed to Cola di Pietro. A fresco depicting the Madonna della Misericordia is attributed to Girolamo Di Giovanni di Camerino.

References

 

Gothic architecture in le Marche
14th-century Roman Catholic church buildings in Italy
Valfornace
Roman Catholic churches in the Marche